Argyropeza schepmaniana is a species of sea snail, a marine gastropod mollusk in the family Procerithiidae.

The specific name schepmaniana is in honor of Dutch malacologist Mattheus Marinus Schepman.

Description

Distribution

References

Procerithiidae
Gastropods described in 1912